Sophoricoside is an isoflavone Genistein glycoside found in the dried ripe fruit of Styphnolobium japonicum (L.) Schott, a herb used in traditional Chinese medicine. At the time the chemical was discovered and named the plant was called Sophora japonica L.

References 

Isoflavone glucosides